Gen. Thomas Boykin House is a historic home located near Clinton, Sampson County, North Carolina.   It was built about 1810, and is a large two-story, hall-and-parlor plan, vernacular Federal style frame dwelling. It has a side gable roof, is sheathed in weatherboard, and has a later one-story, two-roam wing.  It was the residence of General Thomas Boykin (1785-1859), Captain in War of 1812, later a General in the Militia and a three term member of the North Carolina General Assembly.

It was added to the National Register of Historic Places in 1986.

References

Houses on the National Register of Historic Places in North Carolina
Federal architecture in North Carolina
Houses completed in 1810
Houses in Sampson County, North Carolina
National Register of Historic Places in Sampson County, North Carolina